WMGB (95.1 FM, "B95.1") is a radio station licensed to Montezuma, Georgia and serving the Macon, Georgia area with a Top 40 (CHR) format. This station broadcasts on FM frequency 95.1 MHz and is under ownership of Cumulus Media.

External links
B95.1 - Official Site

Contemporary hit radio stations in the United States
Radio stations established in 1999
Cumulus Media radio stations
MGB
1999 establishments in Georgia (U.S. state)